Duchess of Calabria was the traditional title of the wife of the heir apparent of the Kingdom of Naples after the accession of Robert of Naples. It was also adopted by the heads of certain Houses that had once claimed the Kingdom of Naples in lieu of the royal title.

There are at present two claimants to the title of Duchess of Calabria. In the Spanish context, it is the title for the wife of the head of the House of Bourbon-Two Sicilies, and in the Italian context it is the title for the wife of the heir to the Duke of Castro, the head of the Royal House.

Capetian House of Anjou

House of Valois-Anjou

House of Aragon 

For the spouse of the heirs of the Kingdom of Naples between 1504 and 1747; see Princess of Asturias

House of Bourbon

Titular Duchess of Calabria

House of Bourbon-Two Sicilies

Main line claim (1894–1960)

Spanish line claim (since 1960) 
To date there is no sovereign or national state that recognizes such titles to the French-Neapolitan (and fifth son) branch of the House of Bourbon-Two Sicilies, and any claim to this effect by the Dukes of Castro is the result only of self-produced documentation. The only Ducal titles of Calabria, as described below, are recognized only to the Spanish-Neapolitan branch, and this by judgments of 8 March 1984, then 2012 and 2014 by government authorities of the Kingdom of Spain. Even the Italy recognizes the Ducal titles of Calabria to the Spanish-Neapolitan branch and this with a judgment on the sidelines of the hearing of 8 May 1961 at the Court of Naples.

See also
List of consorts of Naples
List of consorts of the Two Sicilies
Princess of Taranto

References

Sources
SICILY

 
Calabria